KJTY is a non-commercial Christian FM radio station in Topeka, Kansas, operating on 88.1 MHz.  The station broadcasts with 35,000 watts from a 584-foot tower giving it a strong signal throughout eastern Kansas.

History

KJTY signed on as a locally owned religious station in 1985, Joy 88, owned by Joy Public Broadcasting. They had a few local programs and nighttime programming came from the Moody Broadcasting Network. On May 25, 2007, Joy sold the station to Family Life Communications, which made the station a part of its 12-station Family Life Radio network.

External links
 Family Life Radio

JTY
JTY
Radio stations established in 1985
Family Life Radio stations
1985 establishments in Kansas